Charles Emmanuel I (12 January 1562 – 26 July 1630), known as  the Great, was the Duke of Savoy from 1580 to 1630. He was nicknamed  (in context "the Hot-Headed") for his rashness and military aggression.

Being ambitious and confident, Charles pursued a policy of expansion for his duchy, seeking to expand it into a kingdom.

Biography

Charles was born in the Castle of Rivoli in Piedmont, the only child of Emmanuel Philibert, Duke of Savoy and Margaret of France, Duchess of Berry. He succeeded his father as duke on 30 August 1580.

Well-educated and intelligent, Charles spoke Italian, French, Spanish, as well as Latin. He proved an able warrior although short and hunchbacked. In the autumn of 1588, taking advantage of the civil war weakening France, he occupied the Marquisate of Saluzzo, which was under French protection. The new king, Henry IV, demanded the restitution of that land, but Charles Emmanuel refused, and war ensued. In 1590 he sent an expedition to Provence in the interests of the Catholic League, and followed it himself later, but the peace of 1593, by which Henry of Navarre was recognized as king of France, put an end to his ambitions. The broader conflict involving France and Spain ended with the Peace of Vervins (2 May 1598), which left the current but separate question of Saluzzo unsolved. After the Duke started talks with Spain, Henry threatened to return to war until, with the Treaty of Lyon (17 January 1601), Saluzzo went to Savoy in exchange for Bresse, Bugey, and Gex.

In 1602 Charles Emmanuel attacked the city of Geneva. On 11 December that year he led his troops to the city during the night and they surrounded the city walls by two in the morning. The Savoyard cuirassiers were ordered to dismount and climb the city walls in full armour as a shock tactic. However, the alarm was raised by a night watchman and Geneva's militia rose to meet the invaders. The attempted raid was a disastrous failure, and 54 Savoyards were killed, with many more captured. Charles Emmanuel's army retreated in a panic and the Savoyard prisoners were executed.

The heavy helmets worn by Charles Emmanuel's troops, with visors made in a stylized imitation of a human face, were known as "Savoyard" helmets after this notorious incident. A number of these suits of armour were captured by the Swiss and kept as trophies. The Geneva militia's successful defence of the city's walls is still celebrated as an act of heroism during the annual festival of L'Escalade.

With the Treaty of Bruzolo (25 April 1610), Charles Emmanuel allied with France against Spain, but the assassination of Henry IV changed the situation, as the treaty was not recognized by Marie de' Medici, who  immediately assumed regency for Henry's son Louis XIII, a minor. Continuing his intrigues, on the death in 1612 of Duke Francesco IV Gonzaga, Duke of Mantua who was lord of the Duchy of Montferrat, Charles Emmanuel made a successful assault on that district. This arrayed the Venetians, Tuscany, the Empire and Spain against him, and he was obliged to relinquish his conquest. Charles Emmanuel obtained the help of French troops to free Alba from the Spaniards, in January 1617, as the new king resumed his father's alliance with Savoy. His sister Christine Marie was married to Charles Emmanuel's son, Victor Amadeus in 1619.

In the First Genoese-Savoyard War of 1625, Charles Emmanuel tried with the help of France to obtain access to the Mediterranean Sea at the expense of Genoa. After Spanish intervention, the status-quo was restored in the Treaty of Monçon.

However, when the French occupied Casale Monferrato during the War of the Mantuan Succession in 1628, Charles Emmanuel allied with Spain. When Richelieu invaded Piedmont and conquered Susa, the duke changed sides again and returned to an alliance with France. However, when Philip IV of Spain sent two invasion forces from Genoa and Como, Charles Emmanuel declared himself neutral, and in 1630 Richelieu ordered a French army to march into Savoy to force the duke to comply with the pacts. The French troops, soon backed by another army, occupied Pinerolo and Avigliana. The Savoy army under Victor Amadeus was defeated in Lower Valsusa.

Charles Emmanuel was one of the most wanted candidates for the crown of a restored Serbian kingdom, hypothetically presumed after a Christian crusade against the Ottoman Empire during planning for the Great Conspiracy of the late 16th and early 17th centuries under the auspices of Serbian Patriarch Jovan, Herzegovinian Duke Grdan and other chiefs of the Serb clans.. At the 1608 Council of Morača, during a gathering of representatives of the Serb clans and the Serbian Church, Charles was elected King of Serbia and invited to convert to Eastern Orthodoxy (as a precondition for being crowned by Patriarch John) and to vow to protect Orthodox Christianity.. The conspirators, bearing closely in mind the failures of the 1590 decade, did not want to expose themselves in any action before direct support from the West was forthcoming. Thus no broad uprising of the Balkan Christian peoples against the rule of the Ottoman Turks was sparked, as Charles Emmanuel lacked the financial resources to take the crown and restore the Serbian statehood extinguished in the 15th century.

In 1609, Charles Emmanuel came in contact with Albanian mercenaries like Giovanni Renesi, his brother Demetrio Renesi and a relative Don Joanne Renesi, who intended to revolt against the Ottomans at the Convention of Kuçi in 1614.

The duke died suddenly of a stroke, while campaigning during the second Monferrato war, at Savigliano in late July 1630. He was succeeded by his son Victor Amadeus.

Marriage and issue

In 1585, Charles married Catherine Michaela of Spain, daughter of Philip II of Spain and Elizabeth of Valois. They had:

 Filippo Emanuele, Prince of Piedmont (1586–1604).
 Victor Amadeus I, Duke of Savoy (1587–1637), married Christine Marie of France
 Emanuel Filibert (1588–1624), Spanish Viceroy of Sicily (1622–24).
 Margherita (1589–1655), married Francesco IV Gonzaga of Mantua.
 Isabella (1591–1626), married Alfonso III d'Este, Hereditary Prince of Modena.
 Maurice, a cardinal (1593–1657).
 Maria Apollonia, a nun in Rome (1594–1656).
 Francesca Catherine, a nun in Biella (1595–1640).
 Thomas Francis, Prince of Carignano (1596–1656) married Marie de Bourbon, Countess of Soissons and had issue;             
 Giovanna (born and died 1597).

In Riva di Chieri on 28 November 1629, he secretly married his long-time and official mistress, Marguerite de Rossillon, Marchesa di Riva di Chieri (bap. 24 December 1599 – 10 November 1640), with whom he had four children, legitimized after the wedding but without succession rights:

 Maurizio (died 1645), Marchese di Poirino, Cavalry colonel.
 Margherita (died 1659), Signora of Dronero, Roccabruna e San Giuliano, married Filippo Francesco d’Este, Marchese di San Martino in Rio (ancestors of Maria Teresa Cybo-Malaspina).
 Gabriele (died 1695), Marchese di Riva, Cavalry lieutenant general.
 Antonio (died 1688), Abbot of San Michele della Chiusa (1642), of Santa Maria d’Aulps (1645), of Altacomba (1653), of San Benigno di Fruttuaria (1660) and Casanuova (1687), Lietunenat General of the County of Nice (1672).

In addition he had several illegitimate children:

— With Luisa de During Maréchal:
 Emanuele (1600–1652), Marchese di Andorno.

— With Virginia Pallavicino:
 Carlo Umberto (1601–1663), Marchese di Mulazzano con Gonzole, married Claudia Ferrero Fieschi.
 Silvio (died 1645), Abbot Commander of Santa Maria d’Entremont (1631), of San Lorenzo fuori le mura d’Ivrea (1642), Governor of Ivrea (1641).
 Vitichindo (d. 1668 or 1674), priest.

— With Argentina Provana:
 Felice (1604–1643), Marchese di Baldissero d’Alba, Signore of Farigliano, Sessanta, Serravalle e Sommariva del Bosco (1629), Lieutenant of the County of Nice 1625/1632.

— With Anna Felizita Cusani:
 Ludovico Cusani (died 1684), Knight of the Order of Saint Maurice and Lazarus.

— With unknown mistress:
Anna Caterina Meraviglia (died 1660).

Legacy 
Charles Emmanuel's military campaigns ignited Italian nationalism and patriotism.

Alessandro Tassoni took up the defense of Charles Emmanuel. In quick succession he published anonymously two Filippiche addressed to the Italian nobility. He exhorted the nobles to discard their lethargy, unite and instead of fighting each other, join Savoy in ridding Italy of Spanish hegemony.

At about the same time that Tassoni was inspired to write the Filippiche, Fulvio Testi, a young poet at the court of the duke of Este, published a collection of poems dedicated to Charles Emmanuel. Not all the poems were of a patriotic nature, but those that were clearly revealed the feelings Charles Emmanuel had stirred in freedom-loving Italians.

More than fifty years later Vittorio Siri still reminisced that “all Italy broke forth with pen and tongue in praises and panegyrics at the name of Carlo Emanuele, and in demonstrations of joy and applause that he had revived . . . the ancient Latin valor, wishing that he . . . [might] one day become the redeemer of Italy's freedom and the restorer of its greatness.”

References

Sources

1562 births
1630 deaths
16th-century Dukes of Savoy
17th-century Dukes of Savoy
Claimant Kings of Jerusalem
Knights of the Golden Fleece
People from Rivoli, Piedmont
Princes of Piedmont
Princes of Savoy